Dharmapala is a Sanskrit name which means "protector of the Dharma". The Pāli equivalent is Dhammapala. The name is often used by Buddhists to refer to a variety of persons and concepts, including:

Buddhism
Anagarika Dharmapala (1864–1933), a 19th-century Sri Lankan Buddhist activist who founded Maha Bodhi Society
Dharmapala, a type of supernatural being in Vajrayana Buddhism
Dhammapala, name of a number of great Theravada Buddhist commentators
Dharmapala of Nalanda (530–561), one of the great scholars of the Yogācāra school

Rulers
Dharmapala (emperor) (ruled 8th century), one of the most powerful rulers of the Pala Empire
Dharma Pala (1035–1060)
Dharmapala Kamboja (11th century), a Kamboja ruler of Kamboja-Pala Dynasty of Bengal
Dharmapala of Kotte (1541–1597), a Sri Lankan ruler of Kingdom of Kotte, who converted to Christianity
Dharmapala, an ancient Kamboja ruler of Kamboja Kingdom, according to Sthala Purana

Others
A. W. Dharmapala, a pioneering broadcaster of Radio Ceylon